Ron Charles may refer to:

 Ron Charles (basketball) (born 1959), American basketball player
 Ron Charles (critic) (born 1962), American literary critic